Pim Walsma (born 3 February 1987, in Amsterdam) is a Dutch baseball player who currently plays for the Amsterdam Pirates and the Dutch national team.

He attended Lower Columbia College in the United States. During his sophomore season, he went 2-3 with a 3.27 ERA.

Walsma debuted in the Hoofdklasse in 2005 and went 1-6 with a 5.11 ERA, walking 38 in 44 innings for the Amsterdam Pirates; he was 5th in the league in free passes. He fell to 1-6, 6.75 in 2006 with 40 walks in 37 innings, finishing 6th in walks. He participated in the MLB European Academy that summer. In 2007, Walsma was 1-2 with a save and a 7.62 ERA for Amsterdam, with 19 hits and 13 walks in 13 innings.

In 2008, he began the season 1-4 with 5 saves and a 4.22 ERA, fanning 48 in 42 IP. Walsma was added to the Dutch national team for the 2008 Haarlem Baseball Week. He allowed one run in 6 IP in the event. He then was selected by coach Robert Eenhoorn in the team that represents the Netherlands at the 2008 Summer Olympics in Beijing.

In the 2009 World Baseball Classic, Walsma got a start against the Puerto Rico.

External links
Walsma's profile at honkbalsite.com

References

1987 births
Living people
Dutch baseball players
2009 World Baseball Classic players
Olympic baseball players of the Netherlands
Baseball players at the 2008 Summer Olympics
Sportspeople from Amsterdam
L&D Amsterdam Pirates players
Corendon Kinheim players